Duet in Detroit is a live album by the drummer Roy Brooks, recorded between 1983 and 1989 and released by Enja in 1993.

Reception

AllMusic awarded the album 4 stars, with a review by Scott Yanow stating: "The music is full of surprises and generally holds one's interest with the trumpet-drums duets being the most unusual."  Jazz Times called it an "exceptionally varied, satisfying collection." The Guardian deemed it "one of the enduring documents of Brooks's sensitivity to a variety of music approaches."

Track listing 
All compositions by Roy Brooks except as indicated
 Introduction – 0:56    
 "Zulu" (Randy Weston) – 8:04
 "Waltz for Sweetcakes" (Weston) – 6:20
 "Elegy for Eddie Jefferson" (Roy Brooks, Woody Shaw) – 12:06
 "Jeffuso" (Brooks, Shaw) – 2:27
 Introduction – 0:37    
 "Forever Mingus" – 11:34
 "Healing Force" (Don Pullen) – 14:52
 "Samba del Sol" – 4:27
 "Duet in Detroit" – 7:33
Recorded August 26, 1983 (#4, 5); May 25, 1984 (#1, 2, 3); July 2, 1987 (#6, 7, 8); February 25, 1989 (#9, 10).

Personnel 
Roy Brooks – drums, percussion, musical saw
Woody Shaw – trumpet (tracks 4 & 5)
Geri Allen (tracks 9 & 10), Don Pullen (tracks 7 & 8), Randy Weston (tracks 2 & 3) – piano

References 

Roy Brooks albums
1993 live albums
Enja Records live albums